Eduards Veidenbaums (Glāznieki, Priekuļi parish, 3 October 1867 — Kalāči, Mūrmuiža parish, 24 May 1892) was a Latvian poet and translator.

Biography 
Eduards Veidenbaums was born at the Glāznieki farmstead in the Priekuļi parish (now territory of Cēsis). In 1872 his family moved to Kālāči in the Mūrmuiža parish. In 1887 after finishing Riga governorate gymnasium, Veidenbaums started to study law at the University of Tartu.

In May 1892 he died of tuberculosis after five months' illness.

Bibliography

Poetry
Dzejas (1896)
Dzejas (London 1900)

Complete works
Kopoti raksti. 1—2. R.: LVI, (1961)
Raksti (1926)
Kopoti raksti. 1—6 (1907–1909)

Selections
Dzejas. R.: Nordik (2005)
Domāju es domas dziļas... R.: Draugi N.I.M.S. (2000)
Brīvības cēlajais gars. R.: Liesma (1978)
Izlase. R.: LVI (1952)

About the writer
Līvija Volkova. Eduards Veidenbaums. R. (1979)
A.Vilsons. Eduarda Veidenbauma dzīve. R. (1967)
Rūdolfs Egle. Eduards Veidenbaums dzīvē un darbos. Cēsis/R. (1926)

References

1867 births
1892 deaths
People from Priekuļi Municipality
People from Kreis Wenden
Latvian male poets
19th-century Latvian poets
University of Tartu alumni
19th-century deaths from tuberculosis
Tuberculosis deaths in Latvia